Colonial Theatre is a historic theater located at 12-14 S. Potomac Street in Hagerstown, Washington County, Maryland, United States. It is a 1914 commercial structure designed by Harry E. Yessler, a Hagerstown architect.  It is three stories high, with a heavily ornamented, Baroque influenced façade. A large marquee bearing the name of the original theater projects over the sidewalk. The upper levels of the façade are constructed of glazed white blocks with gold decorative detailing, in a Palladian window shape, flanked by flat Ionic pilasters.  The theatre showed films until 1973, and is now owned by a church.

It was listed on the National Register of Historic Places in 1978.

References

External links
, including photo from 1975, at Maryland Historical Trust

Theatres on the National Register of Historic Places in Maryland
Buildings and structures in Hagerstown, Maryland
Theatres completed in 1914
National Register of Historic Places in Washington County, Maryland